The 2015–16 Cleveland Cavaliers season was the 46th season of the Cleveland Cavaliers franchise in the National Basketball Association (NBA). The Cavaliers won the 2016 NBA championship, the first NBA championship in franchise history. During the regular season, the Cavaliers had the third best team offensive rating and were tenth in team defensive rating in the NBA. During the playoffs, the Cavaliers had the best team offensive rating and were eighth in team defensive rating in the NBA.

In the playoffs, the Cavaliers swept the Detroit Pistons in four games in the First Round, then swept the Atlanta Hawks in four games in the Semi-finals, before finally defeating the Toronto Raptors in six games in the Conference Finals to reach the NBA Finals for a second consecutive year. There, the Cavaliers faced off against the defending NBA champion Golden State Warriors, the team that defeated them in the previous year's NBA Finals in six games, and were coming off of a record-breaking regular season, where the team posted a league-best 73–9 record.

The Cavaliers would go on to defeat the Golden State Warriors in the 2016 NBA Finals in seven games, coming back from a 3–1 series deficit to avenge their loss from the prior year. The Cavaliers became the first team in NBA Finals history to recover from a 3–1 series deficit and win. The Cavaliers' victory also marked the first championship win by a major professional sports team from Cleveland since 1964, ending a 52–year championship drought dating back to the 1964 NFL title won by the Cleveland Browns. The Cleveland Cavaliers would be the first NBA champion to represent the Central Division since the 2003–04 Detroit Pistons.

Regular season summary 
The Cavaliers started the season strong and rose to the top of the Eastern Conference. However, despite having the best record in their conference, the team fired head coach David Blatt on January 22, 2016. Assistant coach Tyronn Lue took over for the remainder of the season. The Cavaliers finished the regular season with a 57–25 record and obtained the number one seed in the Eastern Conference for the first time since 2010.

Postseason summary 
In the 2016 NBA Playoffs' first round, the Cleveland Cavaliers matched up against the 8th seed Detroit Pistons. In the first game of their series, Cleveland’s point guard Kyrie Irving led the way scoring 31 points and sealing a win for the Cavaliers, 106-101. The Cavs swept the rest of the series, winning 107-90 in Game 2, 101-91 in Game 3, and 100-98 in Game 4. Kyrie Irving was the top scorer of the series averaging 27.5 points per game, LeBron James led the Cleveland Cavaliers in this series in assist and steals, averaging 6.8 assists and 1.8 steals,  and big man Kevin Love led Cleveland in rebounds averaging 12 total rebounds per game. The Cavaliers were matched with the number four seed, Atlanta Hawks, for their second series in the 2015-2016 post-season. Similar to their last series, they swept their opponents 4-0. Lebron James led the way in scoring, averaging 24.3 points per game. He also led his team in assists and steals, averaging 7.8 assists and 3 steals per game. Kevin Love was the rebound leader for the series averaging 13 rebounds per game. The Cavaliers were now facing the Toronto Raptors in the Eastern Conference Finals. The series between the Raptors and the Cavaliers took 6 games to finish with Cleveland winning 4 to 2. This was the first time in their 2015-2016 playoff run that they lost a game. Lebron James led his team in all major stats against the Toronto Raptors. He averaged 26 points, 8.5 rebounds, and 6.7 assists in the 6 game series.  The Cavaliers were off to face the Golden State Warriors in the NBA finals. They were considered huge underdogs because the Warriors had accomplished an incredible feat in the regular season, seventy-three wins and nine losses, the best record ever in the NBA.

The Cavaliers lost three of the first four games of the 2016 NBA Finals to the Golden State Warriors, who had defeated Cleveland in the Finals the year before. The first two games were blowouts for Golden State, 104–89 and 110–77 respectively, combining for a total winning margin of 48. Cleveland would respond with a 120–90 blowout of their own to cut the series deficit to 2–1, but the Warriors would pull away late in Game 4 to take a decisive 3–1 series lead. In turn, the Cavaliers won Games 5 and 6 of the series to bring about a climactic Game 7 at Oracle Arena.

With Game 7 tied at 89–89, LeBron James chased down and blocked Andre Iguodala's attempted lay-up in a play that became known as "The Block." The Cavaliers ultimately won Game 7, 93–89, for the first NBA championship in franchise history. Until then, no team had recovered from a 3–1 deficit in an NBA Finals series. James was named the unanimous NBA Finals MVP, receiving the award for the third time in his career.

This win ended a fifty-two year championship run in the city of Cleveland, with the last championship that any sports team had won there being 1964 when the Cleveland Browns won an NFL season. When the game ended, it was visible the sense of relief that the players felt. Lebron James was the star of the show, and he could not hold his tears back. When he finally got the strength to stand up, the only thing that he was able to say was, "Cleveland, this is for you," as the Oracle Arena blasted with cheers from Cleveland fans. Not only was this a monumental win for the Cleveland Cavaliers it also cemented Lebron James as one of the all-time greats the NBA has ever seen. Prior to this ring, he had only won with the Miami Heat. Haters were quick to disregard his Miami wins because the team were filled with talented players like Dwyane Wade and Chris Bosh, but the win in Cleveland was undoubtedly one of the best basketball performances the NBA has ever seen.

Draft picks

Roster

Player statistics

Regular season

Standings

Preseason

|- style="background-color:#fbb;"
| 1
| October 77:00 pm
| Atlanta
| 96–98
| J. R. Smith (15)
| LeBron James (7)
| LeBron James (5)
| Cintas Center10,250
| 0–1
|- style="background-color:#fbb;"
| 2
| October 87:00 pm
| @ Philadelphia
| 114–115         
| Jared Cunningham (31)
| Austin Daye (9)
| Matthew Dellavedova (5)
| Wells Fargo Center8,229
| 0–2
|- style="background-color:#fbb;"
| 3
| October 127:00 pm
| Memphis
| 81–91
| LeBron James (14)
| Anderson Varejão (7)
| Matthew Dellavedova (4)
| Schottenstein Center18,073
| 0–3
|- style="background-color:#fbb;"
| 4
| October 137:00 pm
| Milwaukee
| 101–110
| Mo Williams (18)
| Kaun, Williams (6)
| Cook, Williams (4)
| Quicken Loans Arena18,624
| 0–4
|- style="background-color:#fbb;"
| 5
| October 157:00 pm
| Indiana
| 85–107
| Timofey Mozgov (16)
| Anderson Varejão (7)
| Jared Cunningham (6)
| Quicken Loans Arena18,774
| 0–5
|- style="background-color:#fbb;"
| 6
| October 188:00 pm
| @ Toronto
| 81–87
| Mo Williams (13)
| Timofey Mozgov (11)
| Dellavedova, Varejão (5)
| Air Canada Centre19,800
| 0–6
|- style="background-color:#bfb;"
| 7
| October 197:00 pm
| Dallas
| 103–97
| J. R. Smith (19)
| Jack Cooley (15)
| Cunningham, Dellavedova (5)
| Quicken Loans Arena18,768
| 1–6

Regular season game log

|- style="background:#fbb;"
| 1
| October 27
| @ Chicago
| 
| LeBron James (25)
| Tristan Thompson (12)
| Mo Williams (7)
| United Center21,957
| 0–1
|- style="background:#bfb;"
| 2
| October 28
| @ Memphis
| 
| Kevin Love (17)
| Kevin Love (13)
| J. R. Smith (7)
| FedExForum18,119
| 1–1
|-style="background:#bfb;"
| 3
| October 30
| Miami
| 
| LeBron James (29)
| Kevin Love (14)
| Matthew Dellavedova (10)
| Quicken Loans Arena20,562
| 2–1

|-style="background:#bfb;"
| 4
| November 2
| @ Philadelphia
| 
| LeBron James (22)
| James, Thompson (9)
| LeBron James (11)
| Wells Fargo Center18,094
| 3–1
|- style="background:#bfb;"
| 5
| November 4
| New York
| 
| LeBron James (23)
| Tristan Thompson (13)
| Matthew Dellavedova (7)
| Quicken Loans Arena20,562
| 4–1
|- style="background:#bfb;"
| 6
| November 6
| Philadelphia
| 
| LeBron James (31)
| Kevin Love (14)
| LeBron James (13)
| Quicken Loans Arena20,562
| 5–1
|- style="background:#bfb;"
| 7
| November 8
| Indiana
| 
| LeBron James (29)
| Kevin Love (15)
| Matthew Dellavedova (9)
| Quicken Loans Arena20,562
| 6–1
|- style="background:#bfb;"
| 8
| November 10
| Utah
| 
| LeBron James (31)
| Kevin Love (8)
| LeBron James (8)
| Quicken Loans Arena20,562
| 7–1
|- style="background:#bfb;"
| 9
| November 13
| @ New York
| 
| LeBron James (31)
| Kevin Love (11)
| LeBron James (6)
| Madison Square Garden19,812
| 8–1
|- style="background:#fbb;"
| 10
| November 14
| @ Milwaukee
| 
| LeBron James (37)
| Kevin Love (14)
| Matthew Dellavedova (7)
| BMO Harris Bradley Center18,717
| 8–2
|- style="background:#fbb;"
| 11
| November 17
| @ Detroit
| 
| LeBron James (30)
| Love, Thompson (9)
| Mo Williams (7)
| The Palace of Auburn Hills18,442
| 8–3
|- style="background:#bfb;"
| 12
| November 19
| Milwaukee
| 
| LeBron James (27)
| Kevin Love (15)
| Matthew Dellavedova (13)
| Quicken Loans Arena20,562
| 9–3
|- style="background:#bfb;"
| 13
| November 21
| Atlanta
| 
| Kevin Love (25)
| Tristan Thompson (16)
| LeBron James (8)
| Quicken Loans Arena20,562
| 10–3
|- style="background:#bfb;"
| 14
| November 23
| Orlando
| 
| Kevin Love (34)
| Tristan Thompson (14)
| LeBron James (13)
| Quicken Loans Arena20,562
| 11–3
|- style="background:#fbb;"
| 15
| November 25
| @ Toronto
| 
| LeBron James (24)
| Kevin Love (13)
| LeBron James (8)
| Air Canada Centre20,140
| 11–4
|- style="background:#bfb;"
| 16
| November 27
| @ Charlotte
| 
| LeBron James (25)
| Kevin Love (16)
| James, Dellavedova (5)
| Time Warner Cable Arena19,093
| 12–4
|- style="background:#bfb;"
| 17
| November 28
| Brooklyn
| 
| James, Love (26)
| Tristan Thompson (11)
| Matthew Dellavedova (6)
| Quicken Loans Arena20,562
| 13–4

|- style="background:#fbb;"
| 18
| December 1
| Washington
| 
| LeBron James (24)
| LeBron James (13)
| LeBron James (4)
| Quicken Loans Arena20,562
| 13–5
|- style="background:#fbb;"
| 19
| December 4
| @ New Orleans
| 
| LeBron James (37)
| Love, Thompson (10)
| LeBron James (8)
| Smoothie King Center17,906
| 13–6
|- style="background:#fbb;"
| 20
| December 5
| @ Miami
| 
| Richard Jefferson (18)
| Kevin Love (8)
| Matthew Dellavedova (5)
| American Airlines Arena19,600
| 13–7
|- style="background:#bfb;"
| 21
| December 8
| Portland
| 
| LeBron James (33)
| LeBron James (10)
| Kevin Love (4)
| Quicken Loans Arena20,562
| 14–7
|- style="background:#bfb;"
| 22
| December 11
| @ Orlando
| 
| LeBron James (25)
| Kevin Love (13)
| LeBron James (8)
| Amway Center17,239
| 15–7
|- style="background:#bfb;"
| 23
| December 15
| @ Boston
| 
| LeBron James (24)
| Timofey Mozgov (10)
| Kevin Love (5)
| TD Garden18,624
| 16–7
|- style="background:#bfb;"
| 24
| December 17
| Oklahoma City
| 
| LeBron James (33)
| Tristan Thompson (15)
| LeBron James (11)
| Quicken Loans Arena20,562
| 17–7
|- style="background:#bfb;"
| 25
| December 20
| Philadelphia
| 
| LeBron James (23)
| Timofey Mozgov (8)
| Irving, James, Smith, Shumpert (4)
| Quicken Loans Arena20,562
| 18–7
|- style="background:#bfb;"
| 26
| December 23
| New York
| 
| LeBron James (24)
| Kevin Love (13)
| Matthew Dellavedova (7)
| Quicken Loans Arena20,562
| 19–7
|- style="background:#fbb;"
| 27
| December 25
| @ Golden State
| 
| LeBron James (25)
| Kevin Love (18)
| Kevin Love (4)
| Oracle Arena19,596
| 19–8
|- style="background:#fbb;"
| 28
| December 26
| @ Portland
| 
| Kevin Love (13)
| Tristan Thompson (11)
| Matthew Dellavedova (6)
| Moda Center19,393
| 19–9
|- style="background:#bfb;"
| 29
| December 28
| @ Phoenix
| 
| Kyrie Irving (22)
| Tristan Thompson (10)
| LeBron James (7)
| Talking Stick Resort Arena18,319
| 20–9
|- style="background:#bfb;"
| 30
| December 29
| @ Denver
| 
| LeBron James (34)
| Kevin Love (14)
| Matthew Dellavedova (5)
| Pepsi Center17,523
| 21–9

|- style="background:#bfb;"
| 31
| January 2
| Orlando
| 
| LeBron James (29)
| Kevin Love (13)
| Matthew Dellavedova (6)
| Quicken Loans Arena20,562
| 22–9
|- style="background:#bfb;"
| 32
| January 4
| Toronto
| 
| Kyrie Irving (25)
| Tristan Thompson (11)
| Kyrie Irving (8)
| Quicken Loans Arena20,562
| 23–9
|- style="background:#bfb;"
| 33
| January 6
| @ Washington
| 
| LeBron James (34)
| LeBron James (10)
| LeBron James (4)
| Verizon Center20,356
| 24–9
|- style="background:#bfb;"
| 34
| January 8
| @ Minnesota
| 
| J.R. Smith (27)
| LeBron James (12)
| LeBron James (8)
| Target Center16,768
| 25–9
|- style="background:#bfb;"
| 35
| January 10
| @ Philadelphia
| 
| LeBron James (37)
| Kevin Love (15)
| LeBron James (9)
| Wells Fargo Center19,226
| 26–9
|- style="background:#bfb;"
| 36
| January 12
| @ Dallas
| 
| LeBron James (27)
| Kevin Love (11)
| Kyrie Irving (9)
| American Airlines Center20,347
| 27–9
|- style="background:#fbb;"
| 37
| January 14
| @ San Antonio
| 
| LeBron James (22)
| Tristan Thompson (11)
| LeBron James (4)
| AT&T Center18,418
| 27–10
|- style="background:#bfb;"
| 38
| January 15
| @ Houston
| 
| Kyrie Irving (23)
| Kevin Love (13)
| LeBron James (7)
| Toyota Center18,320
| 28–10
|- style="background:#fbb;"
| 39
| January 18
| Golden State
| 
| LeBron James (16)
| Kevin Love (6)
| Matthew Dellavedova (6)
| Quicken Loans Arena20,562
| 28–11
|- style="background:#bfb;"
| 40
| January 20
| @ Brooklyn
| 
| James, Love (17)
| Kevin Love (18)
| Irving, James (5)
| Barclays Center17,732
| 29–11
|- style="background:#bfb;"
| 41
| January 21
| L.A. Clippers
| 
| James, Smith (22)
| Kevin Love (16)
| LeBron James (12)
| Quicken Loans Arena20,562
| 30–11
|- style="background:#fbb;"
| 42
| January 23
| Chicago
| 
| LeBron James (26)
| LeBron James (13)
| LeBron James (9)
| Quicken Loans Arena20,562
| 30–12
|- style="background:#bfb;"
| 43
| January 25
| Minnesota
| 
| LeBron James (25)
| Tristan Thompson (12)
| LeBron James (9)
| Quicken Loans Arena20,562
| 31–12
|- style="background:#bfb;"
| 44
| January 27
| Phoenix
| 
| James, Love (21)
| Kevin Love (11)
| LeBron James (9)
| Quicken Loans Arena20,562
| 32–12
|- style="background:#bfb;"
| 45
| January 29
| @ Detroit
| 
| Kevin Love (29)
| Tristan Thompson (14)
| LeBron James (8)
| The Palace of Auburn Hills21,012
| 33–12
|- style="background:#bfb;"
| 46
| January 30
| San Antonio
| 
| LeBron James (29)
| Kevin Love (11)
| LeBron James (7)
| Quicken Loans Arena20,562
| 34–12

|- style="background:#bfb;"
| 47
| February 1
| @ Indiana
| 
| Kyrie Irving (25)
| James, Thompson (12)
| Kyrie Irving (7)
| Bankers Life Fieldhouse17,283
| 35–12
|- style="background:#fbb;"
| 48
| February 3
| @ Charlotte
| 
| Kyrie Irving (26)
| Kevin Love (12)
| LeBron James (6)
| Time Warner Cable Arena19,189
| 35–13
|- style="background:#fbb;"
| 49
| February 5
| Boston
| 
| LeBron James (30)
| Tristan Thompson (10)
| Kyrie Irving (6)
| Quicken Loans Arena20,562
| 35–14
|- style="background:#bfb;"
| 50
| February 6
| New Orleans
| 
| Kyrie Irving (29)
| Tristan Thompson (15)
| LeBron James (8)
| Quicken Loans Arena20,562
| 36–14
|- style="background:#bfb;"
| 51
| February 8
| Sacramento
| 
| Kyrie Irving (32)
| James, Thompson (10)
| Kyrie Irving (12)
| Quicken Loans Arena20,562
| 37–14
|- style="background:#bfb;"
| 52
| February 10
| L.A. Lakers
| 
| Kyrie Irving (35)
| Tristan Thompson (13)
| LeBron James (11)
| Quicken Loans Arena20,562
| 38–14
|- align="center"
|colspan="9" bgcolor="#bbcaff"|All-Star Break
|- style="background:#bfb;"
| 53
| February 18
| Chicago
| 
| LeBron James (25)
| Kevin Love (12)
| LeBron James (9)
| Quicken Loans Arena20,562
| 39–14
|- style="background:#bfb;"
| 54
| February 21
| @ Oklahoma City
| 
| Kevin Love (29)
| Tristan Thompson (11)
| LeBron James (9)
| Chesapeake Energy Arena18,203
| 40–14
|- style="background:#fbb;"
| 55
| February 22
| Detroit
| 
| Kyrie Irving (30)
| LeBron James (8)
| Irving, James (5)
| Quicken Loans Arena20,562
| 40–15
|- style="background:#bfb;"
| 56
| February 24
| Charlotte
| 
| Irving, James (23)
| Tristan Thompson (10)
| Dellavedova, James (7)
| Quicken Loans Arena20,562
| 41–15
|- style="background:#fbb;"
| 57
| February 26
| @ Toronto
| 
| LeBron James (25)
| Tristan Thompson (9)
| LeBron James (7)
| Air Canada Centre19,800
| 41–16
|- style="background:#fbb;"
| 58
| February 28
| @ Washington
| 
| Kyrie Irving (28)
| Timofey Mozgov (10)
| Kyrie Irving (6)
| Verizon Center20,356
| 41–17
|- style="background:#bfb;"
| 59
| February 29
| Indiana
| 
| LeBron James (33)
| Tristan Thompson (11)
| Irving, Love (6)
| Quicken Loans Arena20,562
| 42–17

|- style="background:#bfb;"
| 60
| March 4
| Washington
| 
| Kyrie Irving (21)
| LeBron James (13)
| Kyrie Irving (8)
| Quicken Loans Arena20,562
| 43–17
|- style="background:#bfb;"
| 61
| March 5
| Boston
| 
| LeBron James (28)
| Iman Shumpert (16)
| LeBron James (8)
| Quicken Loans Arena20,562
| 44–17
|- style="background:#fbb;"
| 62
| March 7
| Memphis
| 
| LeBron James (28)
| Kevin Love (11)
| Irving, James (5)
| Quicken Loans Arena20,562
| 44–18
|- style="background:#bfb;"
| 63
| March 9
| @ Sacramento
| 
| Kyrie Irving (30)
| LeBron James (11)
| LeBron James (6)
| Sleep Train Arena17,317
| 45–18
|- style="background:#bfb;"
| 64
| March 10
| @ L.A. Lakers
| 
| Kyrie Irving (26)
| Tristan Thompson (14)
| Kyrie Irving (9)
| Staples Center18,997
| 46–18
|- style="background:#bfb;"
| 65
| March 13
| @ L.A. Clippers
| 
| LeBron James (27)
| Tristan Thompson (14)
| Irving, James (5)
| Staples Center19,342
| 47–18
|- style="background:#fbb;"
| 66
| March 14
| @ Utah
| 
| LeBron James (23)
| LeBron James (12)
| Matthew Dellavedova (5)
| Vivint Smart Home Arena19,911
| 47–19
|- style="background:#bfb;"
| 67
| March 16
| Dallas
| 
| Kyrie Irving (33)
| Kevin Love (18)
| Matthew Dellavedova (7)
| Quicken Loans Arena20,562
| 48–19
|- style="background:#bfb;"
| 68
| March 18
| @ Orlando
| 
| Kyrie Irving (26)
| Tristan Thompson (15)
| LeBron James (8)
| Amway Center18,046
| 49–19
|- style="background:#fbb;"
| 69
| March 19
| @ Miami
| 
| LeBron James (26)
| Frye, Jefferson, Mozgov (4)
| Irving, Shumpert (4)
| American Airlines Arena19,737
| 49–20
|- style="background:#bfb;"
| 70
| March 21
| Denver
| 
| LeBron James (33)
| LeBron James (11)
| LeBron James (11)
| Quicken Loans Arena20,562
| 50–20
|- style="background:#bfb;"
| 71
| March 23
| Milwaukee
| 
| LeBron James (26)
| Kevin Love (10)
| Irving, James (8)
| Quicken Loans Arena20,562
| 51–20
|- style="background:#fbb;"
| 72
| March 24
| @ Brooklyn
| 
| LeBron James (30)
| Kevin Love (12)
| LeBron James (5)
| Barclays Center17,732
| 51–21
|- style="background:#bfb;"
| 73
| March 26
| @ New York
| 
| Kevin Love (28)
| Kevin Love (12)
| LeBron James (10)
| Madison Square Garden19,812
| 52–21
|- style="background:#fbb;"
| 74
| March 29
| Houston
| 
| Kyrie Irving (31)
| Kevin Love (11)
| Kyrie Irving (8)
| Quicken Loans Arena20,562
| 52–22
|- style="background:#bfb;"
| 75
| March 31
| Brooklyn
| 
| LeBron James (24)
| Kevin Love (10)
| LeBron James (11)
| Quicken Loans Arena20,562
| 53–22

|- style="background:#bfb;"
| 76
| April 1
| @ Atlanta
| 
| LeBron James (29)
| LeBron James (16)
| LeBron James (9)
| Philips Arena19,427
| 54–22
|- style="background:#bfb;"
| 77
| April 3
| Charlotte
| 
| LeBron James (31)
| Kevin Love (9)
| LeBron James (12)
| Quicken Loans Arena20,562
| 55–22
|- style="background:#bfb;"
| 78
| April 5
| @ Milwaukee
| 
| J. R. Smith (21)
| Kevin Love (9)
| LeBron James (9)
| BMO Harris Bradley Center15,061
| 56–22
|- style="background:#fbb;"
| 79
| April 6
| @ Indiana
| 
| Kyrie Irving (26)
| Kevin Love (5)
| Kyrie Irving (6)
| Bankers Life Fieldhouse18,165
| 56–23
|- style="background:#fbb;"
| 80
| April 9
| @ Chicago
| 
| LeBron James (33)
| Kevin Love (13)
| Kyrie Irving (8)
| United Center22,186
| 56–24
|- style="background:#bfb;"
| 81
| April 11
| Atlanta
| 
| Kyrie Irving (35)
| Kevin Love (14)
| LeBron James (6)
| Quicken Loans Arena20,562
| 57–24
|- style="background:#fbb;"
| 82
| April 13
| Detroit
| 
| Jordan McRae (36)
| Timofey Mozgov (12)
| Jordan McRae (7)
| Quicken Loans Arena20,562
| 57–25

Playoffs

Game log

|- bgcolor=bbffbb
| 1
| April 17
| Detroit
| 
| Kyrie Irving (31)
| Kevin Love (13)
| LeBron James (11)
| Quicken Loans Arena20,562
| 1–0
|- bgcolor=bbffbb
| 2
| April 20
| Detroit
| 
| LeBron James (27)
| Kevin Love (10)
| Matthew Dellavedova (9)
| Quicken Loans Arena20,562
| 2–0
|- style="background:#bfb;"
| 3
| April 22
| @ Detroit
| 
| Kyrie Irving (26)
| LeBron James (13)
| LeBron James (7)
| The Palace of Auburn Hills21,584
| 3–0
|- style="background:#bfb;"
| 4
| April 24
| @ Detroit
| 
| Kyrie Irving (31)
| Kevin Love (13)
| LeBron James (6)
| The Palace of Auburn Hills21,584
| 4–0

|- style="background:#bfb;"
| 1
| May 2
| Atlanta
| 
| LeBron James (25)
| Tristan Thompson (14)
| LeBron James (9)
| Quicken Loans Arena20,562
| 1–0
|- style="background:#bfb;"
| 2
| May 4
| Atlanta
| 
| LeBron James (27)
| Kevin Love (13)
| Dellavedova, Irving (6)
| Quicken Loans Arena20,562
| 2–0
|- style="background:#bfb;"
| 3
| May 6
| @ Atlanta
| 
| Channing Frye (27)
| Kevin Love (15)
| LeBron James (8)
| Philips Arena19,089
| 3–0
|- style="background:#bfb;"
| 4
| May 8
| @ Atlanta
| 
| Kevin Love (27)
| Kevin Love (13)
| LeBron James (9)
| Philips Arena19,031
| 4–0

|- style="background:#bfb;"
| 1
| May 17
| Toronto
| 
| Kyrie Irving (27)
| Richard Jefferson (11)
| Kyrie Irving (5)
| Quicken Loans Arena20,562
| 1–0
|- style="background:#bfb;"
| 2
| May 19
|  Toronto
| 
| Kyrie Irving (26)
| Tristan Thompson (12)
| LeBron James (11)
| Quicken Loans Arena20,562
| 2–0
|- style="background:#fbb;"
| 3
| May 21
| @ Toronto
| 
| LeBron James (24)
| James, Thompson (8)
| LeBron James (5)
| Air Canada Centre20,207
| 2–1
|- style="background:#fbb;"
| 4
| May 23
| @  Toronto
| 
| LeBron James (29)
| James, Thompson (9)
| Irving, James (6)
| Air Canada Centre20,367
| 2–2
|- style="background:#bfb;"
| 5
| May 25
|  Toronto
| 
| Kevin Love (25)
| Tristan Thompson (10)
| LeBron James (8)
| Quicken Loans Arena20,562
| 3–2
|- style="background:#bfb;"
| 6
| May 27
| @  Toronto
| 
| LeBron James (33)
| Kevin Love (12)
| Kyrie Irving (9)
| Air Canada Centre20,605
| 4–2

|- style="background:#fbb;"
| 1
| June 2
| @ Golden State
| 
| Kyrie Irving (26)
| Kevin Love (13)
| LeBron James (9)
| Oracle Arena19,596
| 0–1
|- style="background:#fbb;"
| 2
| June 5
| @ Golden State
| 
| LeBron James (19)
| LeBron James (8)
| LeBron James (9)
| Oracle Arena19,596
| 0–2
|- style="background:#bfb;"
| 3
| June 8
| Golden State
| 
| LeBron James (32)
| Tristan Thompson (13)
| Kyrie Irving (8)
| Quicken Loans Arena20,562
| 1–2
|- style="background:#fbb;"
| 4
| June 10
| Golden State
| 
| Kyrie Irving (34)
| LeBron James (13)
| LeBron James (9)
| Quicken Loans Arena20,562
| 1–3
|- style="background:#bfb;"
| 5
| June 13
| @ Golden State
| 
| James, Irving (41)
| LeBron James (16)
| LeBron James (7)
| Oracle Arena19,596
| 2–3
|- style="background:#bfb;"
| 6
| June 16
| Golden State
| 
| LeBron James (41)
| Tristan Thompson (16)
| LeBron James (11)
| Quicken Loans Arena20,562
| 3–3
|- style="background:#bfb;"
| 7
| June 19
| @ Golden State
| 
| LeBron James (27)
| Kevin Love (14)
| LeBron James (11)
| Oracle Arena19,596
| 4–3
|- style="background:#bfb;"

Transactions

Trades

Free agents

Re-signed

Additions

Subtractions

Awards, records and milestones

Awards

Records
 JR Smith set franchise records in:
 Three-point field goals in a season: (204)
 Three-point field goal attempts in a season: (510)
 Turnover percentage in a season: (6.3%)
 Three-point field goals in a postseason: (65)
 Tristan Thompson set a franchise record in:
 Offensive rating in a season: (129.8)

Milestones
 On March 29, Tristan Thompson broke the franchise record of consecutive games with the Cavs, appearing in his 362nd consecutive game.
 The Cavs finished the season first in the Eastern Conference for the first time since 2010.
 The Cavs finished first in the Central Division for the second straight season.
 The Cavs became the first team in NBA history to come back from a 3–1 deficit and win the NBA Finals.
 The Cavs won the 2016 NBA Finals, ending the city's 52-year championship drought.
 LeBron James famously blocked Andre Iguodala in Game 7. This has been called one of the best plays of his career.
 LeBron James became the third player in NBA history to record a triple-double in Game 7 of the NBA Finals.
 James also became the first player in NBA history to lead both NBA Finals teams in all five statistical categories for the round.

References

Notes
1.  Varejão never played a single game for Portland.

External links
 What Will 2015-2016 Look Like for the Cavaliers

Cleveland Cavaliers seasons
Cleveland Cavaliers
Cleveland Cavaliers
Cleveland Cavaliers
Eastern Conference (NBA) championship seasons
NBA championship seasons